King Hussein Bin Talal Mosque, better known as the King Hussein Mosque, is the largest mosque in Jordan. Not to be confused with the 1924 Grand Al-Husseini Mosque, also known as King Hussein Mosque, in Downtown Amman.

King Hussein Mosque was built in 2005 in the reign of King Abdullah II in West Amman, specifically in Al Hussein Public Parks at King Abdullah II Street near King Hussein Medical Center. It is square and features four minarets and marble floors.

In 2012, King Abdullah opened the Museum of the Prophet (Matḥaf ar-Rusūl), which houses a number of relics associated with the Islamic prophet Muhammad.

Gallery

References

Mosques in Amman
Tourism in Jordan
Tourist attractions in Amman
Mosque buildings with domes
Mosques completed in 2005